Samuel Iperuszoon, Knight Wiselius (4 February 1769 – 15 May 1845) was a successful Dutch lawyer and a prominent Patriot and democrat, involved in the dismantling of the Dutch East India Company (VOC) and the negotiations over the Cape.  Wiselius was a witty, Voltairian spirit with political views far ahead of his time who would end his days writing dramas on Classical themes. Wiselius corresponded with nearly all the main players at the time of the Batavian Republic and it would be impossible to know that period completely without his carefully kept and neatly written correspondence. He was also a poet, historian and superintendent of the police.

Life

Early life
Samuel was born in Amsterdam, the only son of the oil merchant Iperus Wiselius, himself a Patriot and a captain in the civic guard, promoted to colonel in May 1787. He grew up on Nieuwezijds Kolk, probably the  oldest spot in the city centre. Samuel studied law and classics on the Athenaeum Illustre. In 1786 he travelled to Franeker, and showed his essay on dismissing the local militia in 1650 to Johan Valckenaer and Theodorus van Kooten, then progressive professors at the local University. Although the article went missing, the friendship remained, when the three took a prominent role in the country's future after the year 1795.

Samuel had to write a new thesis and obtained his doctorate from Leiden in 1790. He immediately became a lawyer at the Council of Holland, which also served as a court of law. In 1791 Wiselius was the founder of the brotherhood of l'Infanterie des Cinq Sabres ("Infantry of the Five Sabres") at Leiden, a flirtation with freemasonry. (Mozart had gained great success that year with his masonically-inspired opera The Magic Flute).  Wiselius moved with his family to Amsterdam in a house at Prinsengracht, across the Noorderkerk. He had full house in 1793 with three lectures for the society Doctrina et Amicitia in the Kalverstraat. Wiselius proclaimed that the French Revolution signalled a radical new beginning. No longer was it necessary to take heed of the heavy burden of the past, he argued, but the future could be based on development and progress.

Batavian Republic

When French troops had approached the rivers Rhine and Meuse in November 1794, the Patriots started to prepare for a revolution and to stockpile weapons. The hiding place was discovered, and Jacobus van Staphorst and Cornelis Rudolphus Theodorus Krayenhoff had to leave the city to avoid being captured. The society in the Kalverstraat was closed down by the police and Wiselius, the president, had to announce the message to its members. In January 1795 Wiselius and Nicolaas van Staphorst were part of the revolutionary committee that occupied the townhall. Wiselius stood before the city government in the nearby townhall on the Dam Square to state that the time had arrived for them to resign. The next morning, the new leaders moved in without much ado and voted Rutger Jan Schimmelpenninck as their president. Stadholder William V escaped by boat from the beach near the Hague to England; there were no casualties and it is known as a velvet revolution.

Together with Pieter Paulus, Wiselius advocated an entirely new order, with more powerful central leadership. He distanced himself clearly from the Union of Utrecht, which in his view was only "a weak, barely coherent, and in many senses useless treaty violated almost daily". The vast powers which the Provincial States (the highest authorities in the provinces) had wielded over the past two hundred years were to be reduced to those of mere clerical institutions.

In 1796 he was appointed one of the twenty-eight members of the Committee on the East-Indies Trade and Possessions, along with Wybo Fijnje, with whom he quarrelled two years later.  The committee had to come up with a way of dealing with the bankrupt VOC, a symbol of the Ancien Régime's power. The Dutch East India Company was nationalised, its so-called Outer Chambers in Middelburg, Delft, Enkhuizen and Hoorn closed down and its surplus employees dismissed.  In 1798 the Unitarists Wiselius, Von Liebeherr, Wybo Fijnje and Quint Ondaatje were involved in the plans of a coup by Daendels. The French ambassador Charles Delacroix was willing to help if the Dutch came up with a substantial financial reward. In 1801, Wiselius wrote a pamphlet making a laughing-stock of Guillelmus Titsingh, a former Dutch East India Company-administrator. As a result, Wiselius was not re-appointed as one of the nine members of the Council of Asian Possessions and Establishments. A furious Wiselius accused his former colleagues of mismanagement. Wiselius had more respect for Dirk van Hogendorp, a precursor of Multatuli. In 1807 Herman Willem Daendels was sent to Batavia to prepare for the necessary changes.

Kingdom of Holland
The appointment of Louis Bonaparte as King of the Netherlands led to vehement protests in 1806. Wiselius was among those refusing to offer their services to  "Mr Bonaparte". Left without a post, Wiselius now devoted himself to his private interests: the history of Ancient Greece and of the city of Amsterdam, and writing plays and poems, living in his country house at the borders of the River Vecht.

Later Wiselius was to publish the charter of 1275. He was also involved in the repairs of the dilapidated historic castle Muiderslot, which was to become museum.

It was long suggested that it was Wiselius, not Maria Aletta Hulshoff, who wrote the radical pamphlet entitled  ("An Appeal to the Batavian People"). Valckenaer defended her and Wiselius helped the radical Hulshoff escape to England.  In 1811, the year after, she moved to New York.

Kingdom of the Netherlands

In 1814, Wiselius was appointed director of the Amsterdam Police after he had refused to accept a position in Batavia. He preferred to stay with his children when his wife died.  In 1817, Wiselius was appointed secretary to the Royal Institute of Sciences (KNI) as successor to Willem Bilderdijk. He had been member of the Royal Institute since 1815. In August 1824 Wiselius was visited in his recently rented house, at a prestigious canal in the Jewish neighborhood, not by Louis Bonaparte (as a long-lived legend about his house at Nieuwe Herengracht 99 would have it), but by Gustav IV, the deposed and exiled king of Sweden.  The two men discussed Het Réveil, a new, revivalist religious movement, which had started around 1810 in Switzerland. Wiselius showed him the largest room of his house, with a view on the park and five enormous fixed paintings: hunting scenes by Jan Weenix. A few years before Gustav had given up his attic at the smelly Birsig in Basel.

The fixed paintings were very fashionable and appreciated in the Romantic era. Actually the building had always been favoured by rich and illustrious art lovers, such as Hendrik Gravé and Isaac de Pinto. In 1923, the paintings were sold in a private arrangement by the Order of Poor Ladies to the media magnate William Randolph Hearst, who was travelling through Europe in search of objects for his Hearst Castle estate on the Californian coast. Since a few decades the paintings have been dispersed; two of them are in the Carlyle Hotel in New York, where Hearst lived for some time, one is in Edinburgh, one is since 1953 in the Allen Memorial Art Museum and one painting seems to be lost.

In 1835, as the head of the police, Wiselius was involved in controlling the tax revolts, organized by house owners at Herenmarkt square and in the Jordaan neighbourhood.  Afterwards he and the city mayor were heavily criticised, while sitting dozy in their chairs, after a meal. Wiselius had not attended in person, but had dispatched  a commissioner instead. Wiselius resigned in 1840, but kept his position as secretary of the KNI's literary division for a few more years.

Reception
After his death his son-in-law, P. van Limburg Brouwer, a physician and writer, wrote a dull biography, but with some crucial details. The statesman J.R. Thorbecke in his  ("Historical Sketches"), published in 1860, criticised the biographer, his subject and his florid jargon. Some authors regard Wiselius as forceful, sharp-witted, animated or even overstrung. Simon Schama hardly ever has a positive opinion of Wiselius and the Patriot brotherhood, describing them as only quasi-intellectual, and Wiselius himself as a minor figure, a Jacobin, a renegade and an over-loud, pessimistic drawing-room liberal who shirked real issues, and ended up leaving politics an embittered man.

Works (selection)
 
 . Wiselius, Samuel Iperuszoon / 2e dr / Brest van Kempen / 1828
 
 . Wiselius, S.Iz. / Hendrik Gartman / 1813
 . Wiselius, Samuel Iperuszoon / Willem Holtrop / 1803
 . Wiselius, S.Iz. / W. Holtrop / 1804

Sources

 This article is based entirely or partially on its equivalent on Dutch Wikipedia.

External links
 Entry on Wiselius
 Patriot and Patrian on Wiselius
  DBNL entry for Wiselius
 
 One of the paintings by Jan Weenix, made for Nieuwe Herengracht 99
  Wiselius's introduction of the word "apekool" (humbug or codswallop) into the Dutch language. The word most probably originates in Yiddish.
  Wiselius handwriting
  Entry in German Meyers Grosses Konversation Lexicon

1769 births
1845 deaths
19th-century Dutch historians
18th-century Dutch lawyers
Dutch male poets
Members of the Dutch Patriots faction
Members of the Royal Netherlands Academy of Arts and Sciences
Dutch East India Company people
Writers from Amsterdam
19th-century Dutch lawyers